Garrik Rudolfovich Levin (born 31 January 2003) is a Russian football player who plays for FC Chertanovo Moscow.

Club career
He made his debut in the Russian Football National League for FC Chertanovo Moscow on 22 August 2020 in a game against FC Neftekhimik Nizhnekamsk.

References

External links
 
 Profile by Russian Football National League

2003 births
Sportspeople from Chelyabinsk
Living people
Russian footballers
Russia youth international footballers
Association football midfielders
FC Chertanovo Moscow players